is a 1977 Japanese war drama film, directed by Tengo Yamada based on the Japanese manga series by Keiji Nakazawa. It is a sequel to the 1976 film Barefoot Gen and is the second live-action film based on the manga.

Plot

Cast
 Kazuhide Haruta as "Gen Nakaoka", Barefoot Gen, the protagonist of the story
 Hiroshi Tanaka as "Daikichi Nakaoka", Gen's father
 Mariko Miyagi as "Kimie Nakaoka", Gen's mother
 Chizuko Iwahara as "Eiko Nakaoka", Gen's elder sister
 Fumiko Abe as "Tomoko Nakaoka", Gen's youngest sister
 Ikumi Ueno as "Ryuta"
 Shoji Ishibashi as "Seiji Yoshida"
 Etsuko Ichihara as "Kiyo Hayashi"
 Keiko Takeshita as "Mikiko"
 Keishi Takamine as "Denjiro Samejima"

See also
 Barefoot Gen (anime)
 Barefoot Gen (TV drama)
 Grave of the Fireflies

External links
 

1977 films
Films about the atomic bombings of Hiroshima and Nagasaki
Historical anime and manga
1970s Japanese-language films
Japanese war drama films
Film
Films set in Hiroshima
Films shot in Hiroshima
1970s war drama films
1977 drama films
Japanese World War II films
1970s Japanese films
Live-action films based on manga

ja:はだしのゲン#実写映画